The political party strength in Puerto Rico has been held by different political parties in the history of Puerto Rico. Today, that strength is primarily held by two parties, namely:

 The New Progressive Party (PNP in Spanish) which holds about 39% of the popular vote while advocating for Puerto Rico to become a state of the United States, and 
 The Popular Democratic Party (PPD in Spanish) which holds about 34% of the popular vote while advocating for maintaining the current political status of Puerto Rico as that of an unincorporated territory of the United States with self-government,

The rest of the strength is held by three minority parties
 The Movimiento Victoria Ciudadana (MVC) which holds about 12% of the popular vote while advocating for a constitutional assembly and running on a progressive platform. 
The Puerto Rican Independence Party (PIP in Spanish) which holds about 6% of the popular vote while advocating for the independence of Puerto Rico,

 The Project Dignity (PD) which holds about 6% of the popular vote while advocating for a Christian and conservative platform.

Before the 1952 Constitution
The following table indicates the party of elected officials in the United States insular area of Puerto Rico after 1898:
Governor

The table also indicates the historical party composition in the territorial or Commonwealth:
Senate
House of Representatives
Territory delegation to the U.S. House of Representatives

The Puerto Rican parties are as follows:

 (AC), 
 
 (AP), 

* (C), 

 (E), 

 (EP), 

 (ER), 

 (PIP), 

 (L), 

 (MUS), 

 (NP), 

 (PNP), 

 (PPD), 

 (P), 

 (PT/PPT), 

 (PPR), 

 (RP), 

 (SO), 

 (PSP), 

 (U), and 

 (URP). 
*Coalición was an electoral coalition, not a party.

For a particular year, the noted partisan composition is that which either took office during that year or which maintained the office throughout the entire year. Only changes made outside of regularly scheduled elections are noted as affecting the partisan composition during a particular year. Shading is determined by the final result of any mid-cycle changes in partisan affiliation.

After the 1952 Constitution

See also
 
 Politics of Puerto Rico
 List of political parties in Puerto Rico
 Elections in Puerto Rico

Notes

References

External links
Chronology of Senators, 1917–2007, Senate of Puerto Rico.

Politics of Puerto Rico
Government of Puerto Rico